This is a list of the 100 best-selling singles in France during the 2000s (i.e. release in France from January 1, 2000 to December 31, 2009).

Top 100 of the 2000s

Singles

See also
List of number-one hits (France)

References

French record charts
Lists of best-selling singles
2000s record charts
2000s in French music